Brent Crisp (born 10 September 1986) is a former professional rugby league footballer who last played for the Central Queensland Capras in the Intrust Super Cup. Crisp formerly played for the Canterbury-Bankstown Bulldogs.

Background
Crisp was born in Canberra, ACT, Australia.

Crisp, was reported missing on September 5, 2021. He was last seen 6:50pm on September 4, 2021.

Playing career
Crisp made his first-grade debut against the Manly-Warringah Sea Eagles at Brookvale Oval in round 7 of 2008.

Crisp is a former Aussie rules junior who played in the Goldfields Football League with the Railways club. On his return to the A.C.T., Crisp attended Canberra's Dickson College and gained a position in the Raider's Jersey Flegg team whilst playing at West Belconnen Warriors.

In 2021 Crisp made the move to the strongest domestic rugby league competition in Australia. The NRL NT A-Grade competition. While Crisp showed some early signs he may be able to play a role in the competition, it soon became clear he was getting distracted off field and embracing some of the local delicacies such as Pauls Iced Coffee a bit too much. This culminated in an almighty brain snap in the preliminary final against Palmerston Raiders. His side trailing 18-6 and with Palmerston Raiders stuck on their own line, Crisp took exception to some of the criticism of his weight and the fact he appeared to be playing a Special Teams Role. When lashing out with his feet in the ruck failed to have an effect, Crisp changed tact, directing a verbal barrage at the touch judge, Henry Street. This resulted in a penalty, relieving pressure for the Raiders and earning him a 10 minute spell in the bin. After a promising start to the season, Nightcliff had been bundled out in straight sets.

References

External links
Bulldogs profile

1986 births
Living people
Australian rugby league players
Canterbury-Bankstown Bulldogs players
Central Queensland Capras players
Rugby league fullbacks
Rugby league five-eighths
Rugby league players from Canberra